Hey Now may refer to:

 Hey Now! (Remixes & Rarities), a 2005 album by Cyndi Lauper
 "Hey now!", a catchphrase from The Larry Sanders Show

Songs
 "Hey Now" (Lesley Gore song), 1964
 "Hey Now" (London Grammar song), 2014
 "Hey Now" (Martin Solveig song), 2013
 "Hey Now" (Tantric song), 2003
 "Hey Now (Girls Just Want to Have Fun)", by Cyndi Lauper, 1994
 "Hey Now (Mean Muggin)", by Xzibit, 2004
 "Hey Now", by Eddie Floyd
 "Hey Now", by FM Static from What Are You Waiting For?
 "Hey Now!", by Oasis from (What's the Story) Morning Glory?
 "Hey Now", by Pinhead Gunpowder from Fahizah
 "Hey Now", by the Platters
 "Hey Now", by Red Garland from Groovy
 "Hey Now", by the Regrettes Feel Your Feelings Fool!
 "Hey Now", by Talking Heads from True Stories
 "Hey Now", by TobyMac from Welcome to Diverse City

See also
 Hey Now Hey (The Other Side of the Sky), a 1973 album by Aretha Franklin
 "Hey Now Now", a 1998 song by Swirl 360
 "Iko Iko"